The 2020 LTP Charleston Pro Tennis was a professional tennis tournament played on outdoor clay courts. It was the fourth edition of the tournament which was part of the 2020 ITF Women's World Tennis Tour. It took place in Charleston, South Carolina, United States between 2 and 8 November 2020.

Singles main-draw entrants

Seeds

 1 Rankings are as of 26 October 2020.

Other entrants
The following players received wildcards into the singles main draw:
  Catherine Bellis
  Robin Montgomery
  Emma Navarro
  Kennedy Shaffer

The following player received entry as a junior exempt:
  Diane Parry

The following players received entry from the qualifying draw:
  Hailey Baptiste
  Kateryna Bondarenko
  Magdalena Fręch
  Claire Liu
  Bethanie Mattek-Sands
  Kyōka Okamura
  Mayar Sherif
  Gabriela Talabă

Champions

Singles

 Mayar Sherif def.  Katarzyna Kawa, 6–2, 6–3

Doubles

 Magdalena Fręch /  Katarzyna Kawa def.  Astra Sharma /  Mayar Sherif, 4–6, 6–4, [10–2]

References

External links
 2020 LTP Charleston Pro Tennis at ITFtennis.com
 Official website

2020 ITF Women's World Tennis Tour
2020 in American tennis
November 2020 sports events in the United States
LTP Charleston Pro Tennis
2020 in American women's sports